Wuxia is a town in Wushan County, Chongqing province, China. , it administers Nanling Residential Community and the following 18 villages:
Xiping Village
Liushu Village
Ping'an Village
Donggang Village
Tiaoshi Village
Baiquan Village
Shili Village
Baishui Village
Longshan Village
Lüshui Village
Hongmiao Village
Qingshan Village
Qingquan Village
Qixing Village
Xinlu Village
Chenjia Village
Wenfeng Village
Guihua Village

References

Township-level divisions of Chongqing
Wushan County, Chongqing